Sympycnidelphus is a genus of fly in the family Dolichopodidae.

Species
 Sympycnidelphus californicus Harmston, 1968
 Sympycnidelphus coxalis Robinson, 1967
 Sympycnidelphus sharpi Robinson, 1964
 Sympycnidelphus texanus Harmston, 1968
 Sympycnidelphus tibialis Robinson, 1967

References

Dolichopodidae
Dolichopodidae genera
Diptera of North America
Taxa named by Harold E. Robinson